Jonathan Lisecki (born 1976) is an American producer, director, writer and actor. He was nominated for the Independent Spirit Award for Best First Screenplay for his film Gayby. He is gay and married New Yorker music critic Alex Ross in Canada in 2006.

Filmography

References

External links
 

Living people
American male film actors
American film directors
American film producers
Place of birth missing (living people)
LGBT film directors
American gay actors
American gay writers
American people of Polish descent
1976 births